The Effects of Hurricane Dennis in Mississippi were mostly minor and included one indirect death. On June 29, 2005, a tropical wave emerged off the west coast of Africa. Gradually, the system organized on July 2 and formed a broad low-pressure area. The system continued to develop, and became a tropical depression on July 4. Tracking westward, it became a tropical storm on July 5 and a hurricane on July 7. Dennis rapidly intensified to attain Category 4 status on the Saffir–Simpson scale before making landfall on Cuba. The hurricane weakened to Category 1 status before re-emerging in the Gulf of Mexico and intensifying to Category 4 strength. Dennis made landfall on the Florida Panhandle on July 10 as a Category 3 hurricane, then tracked over southeast Alabama and entered Mississippi as a tropical depression.

Over 40 structures were flooded, forcing 200 people to leave their homes. One indirect death occurred from a traffic accident in Jasper County due to wet roads. During the height of the storm, 24,000 customers were without power. In all, Hurricane Dennis caused $2.6 million (2005 USD) in damage across the state.

Preparations 

At 2100 UTC on July 8 a hurricane watch was put into effect for coastal areas from the Steinhatchee River, Florida to the mouth of the Pearl River. At 0900 UTC on July 9, the hurricane watch was upgraded to a hurricane warning. The hurricane warning was soon downgraded to a tropical storm warning as Dennis moved inland, and by 0300 UTC on July 10 all advisories were discontinued.

In anticipation of Hurricane Dennis, 190,000 people were ordered to evacuate, though many opted not to. Jackson County issued a mandatory evacuation for its residents, while Hancock County called for a voluntary evacuation. Governor Haley Barbour issued a state of emergency, and 600 National Guard soldiers were on standby. Harrison County issued a mandatory evacuation for residents living in low-lying areas, and ordered the closing of its casinos. Also, the Red Cross provided 60 mobile canteens capable of serving 30,000 hot meals to staging areas in Hattiesburg and Jackson. 32 law officials were sent to Hattiesburg to assist with traffic control near the intersection with I-59 and U.S. Route 49. Additionally, a horse park in Starkville was caring for over 50 horses belonging to residents who were forced to evacuate and had no other location for them.

Impact and aftermath 

In Mississippi, damage was not as severe as previously anticipated. Wind gusts peaked at  causing several hundred trees to uproot or snap, damaging a total of 21 homes and businesses.

In Southaven, 40 homes were flooded and 200 were left homeless as a result of the heavy rainfall. A church undergoing construction in Calhoun County was damaged, and a street light in Lee County was snapped. Also, a fallen tree damaged a house in Itawamba County. One indirect fatality occurred in Jasper County from an automobile accident due to wet roads. An estimated 24,000 customers lost electric power during the storm. After the storm, several fires were sparked due to downed electrical wires. In all, the weakening Hurricane Dennis left $2.6 million (2005 USD) in damage.

Although impact was mostly minor, President George W. Bush initially declared 38 counties in Mississippi federal disaster areas, making them eligible for assistance from the Federal Emergency Management Agency (FEMA). In the city of Meridian, over 300 people sought shelter. More than 885 people took shelter in Jackson County, and 1,000 people were in shelters in neighboring Harrison County. On July 15, three additional counties became eligible for federal assistance, bringing the number of declared disaster areas to 41.

See also 

 Effects of Hurricane Dennis in Florida
 Effects of Hurricane Dennis in Alabama
 Effects of Hurricane Dennis in Georgia

References

External links 
 Mississippi aftermath
 

Dennis (2005)
Dennis
Mississippi
2005 in Mississippi
Dennis Mississippi